Daniel Robert Hamilton (June 1, 1946 – December 23, 1994) was an American musician. He was a member of The T-Bones with his brother Judd Hamilton, and later was the lead singer of the soft-rock group Hamilton, Joe Frank & Reynolds. He also was a composer, and wrote the hit songs "Fallin' in Love" and "Diamond Head".

Background
Hamilton was a martial artist and reached the level of 3rd degree black belt.

Early life
Dan Hamilton was born on June 1, 1946, in Spokane, Washington. He attended Eastmont High School in East Wenatchee, Washington. He was the younger brother of Judd Hamilton, who had been a road manager for The Ventures.

Career

1960s
As a singer, songwriter, session musician, Hamilton began his music career at the age of 16 composing instrumentals for The Ventures.

In 1963 he joined The Avantis, a recording group produced by Judd Hamilton. The Avantis included Mexican-American brothers Pat and Lolly Vegas, who were from Fresno, California, Hamilton and drummer Mike Kowalski. When the brothers came to LA, Pat said to his brother Lolly that they needed a new guitarist. Lolly said to his brother that they didn't and Pat replied "Maybe we do". Then Hamilton joined and the group became a support act for the Beach Boys. Later in 1963 the Vegas brothers changed their name back to Pat & Lolly Vegas and worked as the house band of LA's Haunted House Nightclub.
 
Hamilton composed several songs for The Ventures. The most notable of these is "Diamond Head", which the band recorded for their Walk, Don't Run, Vol. 2 album.  "Diamond Head" became an international hit single for Hamilton and the Ventures.  For the week ending March 13, 1965, "Diamond Head" had moved up two notches from #4 to #2 in the Hong Kong Top Ten. The following week it had reached #1 there. The song became Japan's first million-seller and sold more than 1,850,000 copies there. It was a hit in Iran and got to #70 in the US.  The song was later covered by the Aqua Velvets and Susan & The Surftones.  Hamilton wrote several other songs for the Ventures throughout the 1960s, such as "War of the Satellites", "Escape" (which was originally called "Target"), "Wild And Wooly", "Kandy Koncoction", and "The Gallop".

Two of his compositions - "Bullseye" and "No Exit" - were recorded by Mel Taylor and the Magics and appear on the In Action! album which was released in 1966.

In Nov.1965, he once again joined his brother Judd Hamilton to form the touring band The T-Bones. When The T-Bones disbanded in 1968, he along with Joe Frank Carollo and Tommy Reynolds, who had also become members of The T-Bones, rejoined to play clubs around Los Angeles as The Brothers.

1970s
In 1970, Hamilton and Tommy Reynolds co-founded Hamilton Joe Frank & Reynolds when Joe Frank Carollo agreed to come back onboard. Soon after, they recorded their first million-selling 'gold record' for the ABC Dunhill label with "Don't Pull Your Love". Hamilton was the guitarist and main songwriter for the group. Along with Ann Hamilton, he co-composed the hit "Fallin' in Love" which was a hit for HJF&R, reaching #1 on the Billboard Hot 100 in 1975. It was later a hit for La Bouche in 1996 with their version reaching #35 in the Hot 100.

Between those two hit records, Hamilton had a 1972 solo release entitled, "Don't Wait Up for Me Tonight" bw "On the Other Hand", which was credited to Danny Hamilton & Spoondrift. It was released on Dunhill 4320 It even saw a release in New Zealand on Probe PROBE.44.

In Hamilton's final years, he and his brother were recording a country music album as The Hamilton Brothers.

Death
Hamilton died on December 23, 1994 at the age of 48 of complications from Cushing's syndrome.

Later years
In 2012, Hamilton's widow Fredricka Hamilton successfully sued Henry Marx and his Music Force publishing co., and was awarded $562,317 in revenue from the song "Fallin' in Love".

Discography

External links 

 Life of a Roadie: The Gypsy in Me (written by Hamilton, Joe Frank & Reynolds roadie, Ronnie Rush)

References

1946 births
1994 deaths
American male composers
20th-century American composers
American male singer-songwriters
American rock singers
Surf musicians
People from Spokane, Washington
20th-century American singers
20th-century American male singers
The Avantis members
The Marketts members
The T-Bones members
Singer-songwriters from Washington (state)